is a district of Chiyoda, Tokyo, Japan. In Japanese it translates as a "field of a thousand generations"

Chiyoda covers the grounds of the Imperial Palace, and nothing else. It does not have any subdivisions, and no chome or postal code designation. The address of the palace itself and of the Imperial Household Agency is Chiyoda 1-1, the address of the Hospital of the Imperial Household is Chiyoda 1-2, the Imperial Guard Headquarters is Chiyoda 1-3.

Its small population consists of Imperial guards and dependents. The Imperial family itself is not included in the registered population.

Education
 operates public elementary and junior high schools. Kōjimachi Elementary School (千代田区立麹町小学校) is the zoned elementary of Chiyoda district. There is a freedom of choice system for junior high schools in Chiyoda Ward, and so there are no specific junior high school zones.

References

Districts of Chiyoda, Tokyo